Basílica de Nuestra Señora de la Merced may refer to:

 Basilica of Nuestra Señora de la Merced (Lima)
 Basílica de Nuestra Señora de la Merced (Quito)
 Basilica of Our Lady of Mercy, Barcelona
 Basilica of Our Lady of Mercy (Yarumal)